Quill is an unincorporated community in Gilmer County, in the U.S. state of Georgia.

History
A post office called Quill was established in 1904, and remained in operation until 1953. The community was named after a local Cherokee scribe.

References

Unincorporated communities in Gilmer County, Georgia
Unincorporated communities in Georgia (U.S. state)